Community Unit School District 20 may refer to:
 Beecher City Community Unit School District 20 — in Effingham County
 Lawrence County Community Unit School District 20